Procrica sanidota is a species of moth of the  family Tortricidae. It is found on Mauritius and the Comoros (Grande Comore, Mayotte) in the Indian Ocean.

References

	

Moths described in 1912
Archipini